Joseph Jacob (Liège 1865 – Brussels 25 October 1909) was a Belgian cellist who taught at the Ghent Conservatory  and played in the Ysaÿe Quartet from 1886.

Jacob's students included Rosario Bourdon.

As a member of the Ysaÿe Quartet, he premiered Claude Debussy's String Quartet on December 29, 1893.

References

Belgian classical cellists
1865 births
1909 deaths
19th-century classical musicians